This is a list of disasters that have occurred in New York City organized by death toll. The list is general and comprehensive, comprising natural disasters (including epidemics) and man-made disasters both purposeful and accidental. It does not normally include numerous non-notable deadly events such as disease deaths in an ordinary year, nor most deaths due to residential fires, traffic collisions and criminal homicide. Particularly for epidemics, years reflect when the event impacted New York City rather than the world at large.

See also
List of accidents and disasters by death toll
List of natural disasters by death toll
List of battles and other violent events by death toll
List of disasters in the United States by death toll

Notes

References

Death in New York City
Death Toll
 
New York City disasters by death toll
Death Toll
Disasters